Jean-Martin Fortier (born 1978) is a Québécois farmer, author, educator and advocate for ecological, human-scale and economically-viable sustainable agriculture.

He is the founder, with his wife, Maude-Hélène Desroches, of Les Jardins de la Grelinette, a certified organic market garden in Saint-Armand, Quebec.  The farm has become internationally known for achieving profitability and productivity using biologically intensive cropping systems.  The low-tech, high-yield methods of production employed on the micro-farm form the basis of Fortier's book, The Market Gardener: A Successful Grower's Handbook for Small-Scale Organic Farming.

An educational film called The Market Gardener's Toolkit, in which Fortier describes the tools and techniques used on his farm was released in 2016.

Biography
Fortier met his wife and farming partner while both were studying at McGill University's School of Environment.  After graduating in 2001, Fortier and Desroches spent time working on organic farms in the United States and Mexico.  They farmed 0.2 acre of rented land before settling on their own farm in Saint-Armand, Quebec in 2004.

Fortier's first book, The Market Gardener, was first published in French in 2012.  He has published articles about his work in Canadian Organic Grower, La Terre de Chez Nous and Growing for Market.  Fortier has worked with the Montreal-based non-profit Équiterre to promote the development of community-supported agriculture, and with the Vancouver-based Young Agrarians network to encourage and educate young entrants into sustainable agriculture.

Fortier is enthusiastic about the development of appropriate technology for small-scale farming and serves as a tool and equipment advisor for Johnny's Selected Seeds and Dubois Agrinovation.

Les Jardins de la Grelinette
Les Jardins de la Grelinette was named after the grelinette, or broadfork, a gardening tool that for Fortier is "emblematic of manual, ecological and effective organic gardening."  1.5 of the farm's 10 acres are kept in biologically intensive production.  The farm produces variety of organic vegetables, as well as some herbs and fruits. The farm direct markets its products at the Knowlton and St.-Lambert farmers' markets in Montreal, to restaurants and stores, and through 140 community-supported agriculture (CSA) shares.  In the farm's fourth season, when sales first topped $100,000, the business won a farming competition prize for its outstanding economic performance.  The farm now grosses about $140,000 in sales in a typical year.  Fortier and Desroches employ paid staff and host interns. Since 2015, Desroches has been running the farm on her own, reaching ever higher profit margins.  They also host on-farm events and tours to help promote sustainable farming.

Production methods 
Fortier maximizes yields on a minimum area of land through a "biologically intensive" cropping system.  Conventional 4-wheel tractors are eschewed in favor of hand tools and efficient small-scale equipment such as walk-behind tractors.  Since hand tools are used for cultivation, rows of crops do not need to be spaced according to the dimensions of a tractor and cultivating implements, allowing for intensive spacing.  Multiple successions of plantings in a year contribute to a high ratio of yield/area.  Minimizing the growing area needed increases the efficiency of the farm in terms of labor (e.g. time needed to cultivate) and materials (e.g. irrigation lines, row cover).  Efficiency is also achieved through the standardization of the size of growing spaces - the farm consists of 10 plots containing 16 beds, each bed is 30 inches wide and 100 feet long.  This standardization facilitates crop rotation, production planning, calculation of soil amendments, and use of materials such as irrigation lines and row covers.

The Market Gardener
The Market Gardener was first published in French in 2012 as Le Jardinier-Maraîcher by Éditions Écosociété. The book is illustrated by Marie Bilodeau.

In 2013, charitable organization FarmStart launched an online fundraising campaign to support the English translation of the book.  The English translation by Scott Irving was published in early 2014 by New Society Publishers.  The translation includes a foreword by Severine von Tscharner Fleming of the American non-profit network the Greenhorns and the National Young Farmers Coalition.

The book is designed to serve as a practical handbook for small-scale farming.  It details Fortier's production methods and business practices, and includes information on topics such as market garden design, small-scale equipment, soil management, seeding, weed management, insect and disease management, crop planning, and marketing.

Promotion 
Fortier has promoted the French language version of the book through speaking tours in Quebec, France and Belgium.

The English language edition is being promoted under the banner of the "Six Figure Farming Tour," sometimes referred to as the "Rock Star Farmer Tour," which focuses on promoting farming as a means of earning a comfortable living. The tour has been carried out in cooperation with young farmer and sustainable agriculture non-profits and projects, including Young Agrarians, FarmStart, National Young Farmers Coalition, Acorn, Friends of Family Farmers, Missouri Young Farmers Coalition, and others.

Reception
The Market Gardener has sold more than 100,000 copies.  The book has received very positive reviews; it has been complimented as practical, accessible and comprehensive. Reviewers have noted that the book's emphasis on the business aspects of market gardening sets it apart from similar publications.

The book has drawn favorable comparison to farmer Eliot Coleman's influential 1989 book The New Organic Grower.  Coleman, who himself reviewed the book, has stated, "Jean-Martin’s book is very well done and should be of great use to market growers everywhere. Exchange of ideas and information is so important because when we pass ideas on, the next person gets to start where we got to and take the ideas to another level."

In July 2016, Éditions Écosociété announced on its Facebook page that the book's rights had been purchased to be translated into German by publisher Löwenzahn Verlag, in Dutch by Uitgeverij Jan van Arkel and in Polish by Fundacja Źródła Życia.

Ferme des Quatre-Temps 
In the fall of 2015, Fortier was recruited by André Desmarais, Deputy Chairman, President and Co-Chief Executive Officer of Power Corporation and son of Paul Desmarais Sr, to design and operate a model farm, La Ferme des Quatre-Temps, on a 167 acres property in Hemmingford, Quebec.  The mission of the farm is to demonstrate how diversified small-scale farms, using regenerative and economically efficient agricultural practices, can produce a higher nutritional quality of food and more profitable farms than conventional agriculture.

The farm consists of four acres of vegetable production; sixty acres of animal grazing rotation including beef, pigs and chickens, ten acres of fruit orchards, a culinary laboratory for processing and creating original products and a huge greenhouse to produce vegetables throughout the year.  The principles of permaculture were applied to ensure ecosystem balance: flowers were planted, ponds were dug to accommodate frogs and birdhouses were built to naturally control the proliferation of pests. Ten bee hives have also been installed on the property to promote pollination and mobile chicken coops allow hens to roam from one pasture to another to feed the worms in manure from cows.

Books by Fortier

References

External links 

 The Market Gardener Website
 The Market Gardener's Masterclass Website
 Les Jardins de la Grelinette Website (french)
 Podcast: A Model for Profitable Micro-Farming, Peak Prosperity, Mar 29, 2014
 Podcast: Jean-Martin Fortier, Greenhorns Radio, Mar 18, 2014
 Video: Organic Farming in Your Backyard, Morning News Montreal, Feb 13, 2014
 Podcast: Jean-Martin Fortier on Being Awesome at Market Gardening, The Ruminant Podcast, Jan 12, 2014
 Interview: Agrariannaire # 2 With Jean-Martin Fortier, Young Agrarians, Dec 19, 2013
 Podcast: Grow Better, Not Bigger.  The Market Gardener - Producing $140,000 on 1.5 Acres, Permaculture Voices, PVP051 
 Video: Jean-Martin on Starting to Farm
 Video: Market Gardener, CTV Morning Live

1978 births
Canadian farmers
Living people
McGill University Faculty of Agricultural and Environmental Sciences alumni
Organic farmers